Tithoes maculatus is a species of beetle belonging to the family Cerambycidae.

Description
Head and thorax are blackish, while elytra are brown, with whitish blotches. Males of this longicorn beetle has a very large head and long, strong, falciform mandibles. Three spiny teeth are present on both lateral edges of prothorax.

Distribution
This species is widespread in Angola, Benin, Burkina Faso, Cameroon, Central African Republic, Côte d'Ivoire, Gabon, Gambia, Guinea Bissau, Mali, Niger, Nigeria, Rwanda, Senegal, Sudan, Chad and Togo.

Subspecies
 Tithoes maculatus centralus Lameere, 1903
 Tithoes maculatus maculatus Olivier, 1975

References
 Biolib
 Prioninae.org
 Longicorn ID

Prioninae
Beetles described in 1792